Orthobunyavirus is a genus of the Peribunyaviridae family in the order Bunyavirales. There are currently ~170 viruses recognised in this genus. These have been assembled into 103 species and 20 serogroups.

The name Orthobunyavirus derives from Bunyamwera, Uganda, where the original type species Bunyamwera orthobunyavirus was first discovered, along with the prefix  meaning 'straight.'

Epidemiology
The genus is most diverse in Africa, Australia and Oceania, but occurs almost worldwide. Most orthobunyavirus species are transmitted by gnats and cause diseases of cattle. The California encephalitis virus, the La Crosse virus and the Jamestown Canyon virus  are North American species that cause encephalitis in humans.

Virology

The virus is spherical, diameter 80 nm to 120 nm, and comprises three negative-sense single stranded RNA molecules encapsulated in a ribonucleocapsid.
The three RNAs are described as S, M and L (for Small, Medium and Large) and are circa 1kb (kilobases), 4.5kb and 6.9kb in length
The S RNA encodes the Nucleocapsid protein (N protein) and a non structural protein (NS Protein).
The M RNA encodes a polyprotein which is cleaved by host protease into Gn, NSm and Gc proteins.
The L RNA encodes the viral RNA dependent RNA Polymerase or L Protein

Life cycle

Vectors 
The primary vectors of Orthobunyaviruses are hematophagous insects of the Culicidae family, including members from a number of mosquito genera (including Aedes, Coquillettidia, Culex, Culiseta, and Anopheles) and biting midges (such as Culicoides paraensis). Although transmission by ticks and bed bugs may also occur. Viral vector preference is generally strict, with only a one or very small number of vectors transmitting a specific virus in the region, even where multiple viruses and vectors overlap. Organisms related to the preferential vector may be able to carry a virus but not competently transmit it.

The vector arthropod acquires the virus while taking a blood meal from an infected host. In mosquitoes, replication of orthobunyaviruses is enhanced by immune modulation that occurs as a result of blood protein digestion producing GABA and the activation of GABAergic signalling. Infection is transmitted to a new host via viral particles in vector saliva. Orthobunyavirus infection in arthropod cells is not fully understood, but is generally non-cytopathological and deleterious effects are minimal. Infected mosquitoes may experience an increase in fitness. Transorvarial transmission has been observed among mosquitoes infected with orthobunyaviruses of the California serogroup Like mosquitoes, only female culicoid midges feed on blood; they prefer indoor feeding particularly during rain.

Sylvatic Cycle Hosts 
In the sylvatic cycle, viruses are transmitted between mammalian hosts by the arthropod vector. A diverse range of mammals have been identified or implicated as hosts or reservoirs of orthobunyaviruses including: non-human primates, sloths, wild and domestic birds, marmosets, rodents, and large mammals such as deer, moose, and elk.

Infection 
Infection begins with the bite of an infected competent vector organism. Viral entry proceeds by receptor-mediated (clathrin-dependent) endocytosis, but which receptors unknown. Although, Heparan sulfate and DC-SIGN (CD209 or Dendritic cell-specific intracellular adhesion molecule-3-grabbing non-integrin) have been identified as viral entry components in some orthobunyaviruses. Gn/Gc heterodimers on the viral surface are responsible for target cell recognition, with Gc is considered the primary attachment protein, although Gn has been suggested as the attachment protein for LACV in arthropod cells. Acidification of the endosome triggers a conformational change in the Gc fusion peptide, uncoating the ribonuclearprotein (RNP) as it is released into the cytoplasm.

Upon release into the cytoplasm, primary transcription begins with an endonuclease domain on L protein engaging in a process known as "cap-snatching." During cap-snatching, 10-18 nucleotides of 5' 7-methylguanylate primers are cleaved from host mRNAs and attached to prime the 5' end of the viral RNAs. Like all negative-sense RNA viruses, orthobunyaviruses require ongoing, concurrent translation by the host cell to produce full-length viral mRNAs, consequently the 3' end of orthobunyavirus mRNAs lack polyadenylation. Notably they are also missing the signal for polyadenylation; instead the 3' ends are thought to form a stem-loop structure. Antigenomes (full length positive-sense RNAs) used as templates for replication of the viral genome are produced by L protein RdRp without the need for primers. Both negative-sense genomes and positive-sense antigenomes are associated with N proteins (forming RNPs) at all times during the replication cycle. Thus, N and L are the minimum proteins required for transcription and replication

The M genome segment codes for the Gn-NSm-Gc polyprotein on a single open-reading frame (ORF) which is cotranslationally cleaved by internal signal peptides and host signal peptidase. The free glycoproteins Gc and Gn insert into the membrane of the endoplasmic reticulum and form heterodimers. A Golgi retention signal on Gn, permits transport of the heterodimers to the Golgi apparatus, where glycosylation occurs. The presence of the viral glycoproteins modifies the Golgi membrane to enable budding of RNPs into a Golgi derived tubular viral factory (viroplasm). As segmented viruses, orthobuynaviruses require precise packaging of one of each of the three genomic segments into the final virion to produce a mature, infectious particle. Packaging appears to be directed by signals contained entirely within UTR sequences. The packaged genomes acquire a lipid membrane as they bud into the viral factories, are then transported to the host cell plasma membrane and released via exocytosis. A final gylcoprotein modification upon release produces a mature, infectious particle.

Evolution 
Orthobunyaviruses evolve partly by a key mechanism known as genomic reassortment, which also occurs in other segmented viruses. When viruses of the same group co-infect a host cell, mixtures and novel combinations of the S, M, and L segments can be produced, increasing diversity. The most common reassortment events are with the L and S segments.

Taxonomy 
There are 103 species in the genus:

See also

 63U-11 virus
 75V-2621 virus

References

External links 
 ICTV Report: Peribunyaviridae
 Viralzone: Orthobunyavirus

Orthobunyaviruses
Virus genera